The Duhamel scandal is a 2021 scandal that involved a leading Parisian  social and political sciences university, Sciences Po. The scandal originated from accusations in a book written by Camille Kouchner, La Familia Grande. In that book, Camille Kouchner, who is the daughter of former minister Bernard Kouchner, accuses Olivier Duhamel, her step-father, of sexually abusing her twin brother. 

The scandal was compared to a "bomb" launched on Sciences Po and to an "unpinned grenade". Olivier Duhamel, who was president of the National Foundation of Sciences Po, resigned along with other members of the board. It led to other scandals and a succession crisis. The hashtag #SciencesPorcs was also created. While the book and media coverage questioned Sciences Po's responsibility in covering up sexual abuse and other acts of pedophilia, the school was ultimately exonerated of the allegations.

History and scandal 
Olivier Duhamel was the president of the Fondation Nationale des Sciences Politiques (FNSP), which oversees and finances Sciences Po, and a revered professor and politician. After the sexual abuse allegations, Duhamel resigned from his job at the FNSP, as host of a popular radio programme on Europe 1, and deleted his Twitter account.

In her book, Camille Kouchner explains that dozens of her mother's intellectual friends knew about the abuse but chose to keep quiet. It has been reported that Duhamel also organized events with the French intelligentsia, involving adults and children partaking in sexual acts and alcohol consumption. In La Familia Grande, Camille Kouchner depicts the environment in which such events took place, and how the intelligentsia justified them intellectually. Nudity among children and adults was encouraged. Duhamel took photos of children and adults and hung them in large format on the walls. According to a witness who talked to Le Nouvel Obs but whose identity has not been revealed, children were told about sex and then asked to mime sexual acts in front of their parents. Twelve-year-old girls were dressed in provocative clothes and makeup, and sent to dance with 40-year-old men. Older children were asked to tell the audience about their first sexual experiences. Young boys were "offered" to older women. All of these acts were "brushed aside and silenced based on 1970s hedonism and complex parents-children relations." 

The abuse allegedly started in 1989 when Camille's brother was fourteen-years-old. In 2008 that he, 33 years-old, revealed the sexual abuse to his mother Évelyne Pisier and aunt Marie-France Pisier. Évelyne Pisier, professor at Sciences Po did not leave her husband and defended him. Marie-France Pisier, on the other hand, took great offence at the event and her sister's inaction. In 2011, Marie-France Pisier was found dead in her swimming pool. The underlying cause of death was registered as suicide, but it is unclear if this tragic event is linked to the above-mentioned scandal. Évelyne Pisier passed away in 2017.

Bernard Kouchner learned about it in the 2010s and wanted to bash Duhamel, but Camille Kouchner prevented him. He went on to applaud his children's courage and honesty.

Aftermath 

The scandal was compared to a "bomb" launched on Sciences Po (Le Figaro) and to an "unpinned grenade thrown at Sciences Po" (Le Temps and Courrier International). Olivier Duhamel, director of the National Foundation of Sciences Po, Frédéric Mion, director of Sciences Po, and other members of the board of these institutions resigned. It led to other scandals and a succession crisis. The hashtag #SciencesPorcs was also created. While the book and media coverage questioned Sciences Po's responsibility in covering up sexual abuse and paedophilia, the school was exonerated of the allegations.

Camille Kouchner's book sparked a wave of reactions on Twitter under the hashtag #MetooIncest and #MeTooGay. Other alleged rape victims further confirmed to Le Monde Camille Kouchner's allegations. An investigation concerning Duhamel was opened by Paris prosecutors in January 2021 about "rape and sexual aggression against a minor". The scandal broke a national taboo on the abuse of minors and accelerated the advent of new child protection laws.

In April 2021, Duhamel confessed to sexually abusing his stepson.

References

2021 in France
Sciences Po
Political scandals in France
Sexual abuse cover-ups